The 1991 New Year Honours in New Zealand were appointments by Elizabeth II on the advice of the New Zealand government to various orders and honours to reward and highlight good works by New Zealanders. The awards celebrated the passing of 1990 and the beginning of 1991, and were announced on 31 December 1990.

The recipients of honours are displayed here as they were styled before their new honour.

Knight Bachelor
 James Belich – of Wellington. For services to local government and the community.
 The Right Honourable (Mr Justice) Gordon Ellis Bisson – of Wellington; lately a judge of the Court of Appeal.
 The Honourable Roger Owen Douglas – of Auckland. For public services.
 Dr David Russell Hay  – of Christchurch. For services to the New Zealand Heart Foundation.

Order of Saint Michael and Saint George

Knight Commander (KCMG)
 The Right Honourable Geoffrey Winston Russell Palmer – of Wellington; Prime Minister of New Zealand, 1989–1990.

Companion (CMG)
 Walter Iles  – of Wellington; Chief Parliamentary Counsel.
 The Honourable Stanley Joseph Rodger – of Dunedin. For public services.

Royal Victoria Order

Lieutenant (LVO)
 Paul George Canham – lately Official Secretary, Government House.

Order of the British Empire

Dame Commander (DBE)
Civil division
 Stella Katherine Casey – of Wellington. For services to the community.

Commander (CBE)
Civil division
 Dr Donald Maurice Geddes Beasley  – of Whangārei. For services to the intellectually handicapped, health administration and the community.
 James Alan Burnet – of Wellington. For services to the newspaper industry.
 David James Frith – of Wellsford; chairman, New Zealand Meat Producers Board.
 Professor Barbara Farnsworth Heslop – of Dunedin. For services to medical education.
 Canon Wi Te Tau Huata  – of Hastings. For services to the community
 Phoebe Churchill Meikle – of Auckland. For services to education and literature.
 Arthur Douglas Myers – of Auckland. For services to business management.
 John James (Jack) Shallcrass – of Wellington. For services to education.

Military division
 Air Commodore John Stewart Boys   – Royal New Zealand Air Force.

Officer (OBE)
Civil division
 Frederick Richard Allen – of Auckland. For services to rugby.
 Peter James Blake  – of Emsworth, Hampshire, England. For services to yachting.
 John Edward Bolderson – of Levin. For services to local government.
 The Honourable Trevor Albert de Cleene – of Palmerston North. For public services.
 Patrick James Downey – of Wellington. For services to the community.
 Edward Farnon – of London, England. For services to international trade.
 Dr Elizabeth Alice Flint – of Christchurch. For services to botany.
 Arnot Malcolm McConnell – of Auckland. For services to engineering and export.
 Ian Lindsay Mills  – Assistant Commissioner, New Zealand Police.
 Ian Barry Mune – of Kaukapakapa. For services to the theatre and film industry.
 Richard Barton Rainey – of Nelson. For services to the community.
 Professor David Christopher Graham Skegg – of Dunedin. For services to medicine.
 David John Stock – of Christchurch. For services to the legal profession.
 Peter William Taylor – of Alexandra. For services to the fruit industry.
 Graeme Allen Thompson – of Christchurch. For services to export.
 Gladys Ellen Walker – of Auckland. For services to bowls.
 Guyon Russell Wells – of Hamilton. For services to music.

Military division
 Captain John Andrew Westphall – Royal New Zealand Navy.
 Colonel David George Flux – Colonels' List, New Zealand Army.

Member (MBE)
Civil division
 Leslie Wightman Barber – superintendent, New Zealand Police.
 Dr Peter Walter Theodore Brandt – of Auckland. For services to cardiac radiology.
 Joseph Annis Corban – of Auckland. For services to viticultural industry, and the community.
 Noel Effie Burn – of Paraparaumu. For services to women's bowls.
 Dr Grahame David Craig – of Hamilton. For services to business management and the community.
 Noel Edward Crawley  – of Orewa. For services to education and the community.
 Egbert Feist – of Wanganui. For services to local government and the community.
 Edward Kingsley Fletcher  – of New Plymouth. For services to local authorities and the community.
 Robert Charles Francis – of Masterton. For services to local government and the community.
 Terence Charles Hansen – of Christchurch. For services to the furniture industry and the community.
 Ronald Fife Hardie  – of Kawerau. For services to local government.
 Karen Margaret Holliday – of Motueka. For services to cycling.
 Kevin Louis Hope  – of Greymouth. For services to trade-union affairs and the community.
 Murray Clarke Loudon – of Auckland. For services to the dental profession and the community.
 Hugh Joseph McGahan – of Blakehurst, New South Wales, Australia. For services to rugby league.
 Ronald Marston  – of Petone. For services to local-body and community affairs.
 Rora Pakititi – of Te Kūiti. For services to the community.
 Archibald John Philpot – of Auckland. For services to the community.
 Samuel Kevin Prime – of Kawakawa. For services to the community.
 Selwyn Ingram Rowley – of Auckland. For services to crippled children.
 William Alexander Russ – of Auckland. For services to the community.
 Wayne Thomas Shelford – of Silverdale. For services to rugby.
 Heather Victoria Spurle – of Auckland. For services to sports.
 Julie-Ann Townsend – of Auckland. For services to netball.
 Dr John Moore Tweed – of Wellington. For services to rheumatology.

Military Division
 Lieutenant Michael Arthur Edsall – Corps of Royal New Zealand Electrical and Mechanical Engineers (Territorial Force).
 Warrant Officer Leslie Ross Marfell – Royal New Zealand Air Force.

British Empire Medal (BEM)
Military division
 Temporary Warrant Officer Class II Paul Edward Napier – Royal New Zealand Armoured Corps.
 Staff Sergeant Stephen John Yates – Royal New Zealand Infantry Regiment.
 Flight Sergeant Clive Peter Harragan – Royal New Zealand Air Force.

Companion of the Queen's Service Order (QSO)

For community service
 Whatumoana Paki – of Huntly.
 Itieli Pereira – of Fakaofo, Tokelau.
 Peter Graham Siddell – of Auckland.
 Thomas Arthur Varley   – of Waikanae.

For public services
 Judith Ola Bassett – of Auckland.
 Arnold Frank Crothall – of Christchurch.
 Robert Anthony Regis Harvey – of Auckland.
 Andrew Kirkland – of Wellington; lately managing director, New Zealand Forestry Corporation.
 Judy Margaret Lessing – of New York, United States
 Ian McLean – of Rotorua.
 Dr (Elizabeth) Anne Meade – of Wellington.
 Barbara Gay Williams  – of Wellington.

Queen's Service Medal (QSM)

For community service
 Evelyn Ellen Mary Baigent – of Tākaka.
 Brysson Gurle le Comte Bartley – of Auckland.
 Isabella May Blair  – of Napier.
 Patricia Gweneith Broad – of Dunedin.
 Norman Colin Brown – of Waimate.
 Winiata Brown – of Kaitaia.
 Doris Elizabeth Church – of Christchurch.
 Sydney Cormack – of Tuatapere.
 Te Haruru (Ruru) Cook – of Cromwell.
 Johannes Gerardus de Jager  – of Auckland.
 Anthony William Finnigan – of Palmerston North.
 William Robert Hamer – of Wellington.
 Stanley Lionel Harris – of Auckland.
 Francis Leo Hendrey – of Auckland.
 Te Aukura David Isaia – of Porirua.
 Francis William James Jennings – of Auckland.
 Lawrence Fredrick Cecil Johnson – of Christchurch.
 Valerie Merle Jones – of Te Kūiti.
 The Reverend Romana Tautari Kingi  – of Whakatāne.
 Amy Anealeise Laban – of Wainuiomata.
 The Reverend Father Michael Lapsley – of Victoria, Australia.
 Robert Francis McCallum – of Wellington.
 Eva Ruth Mann – of Waimate.
 Daphne Meyer – of Ōtaki.
 Frances Betty Monehan – of Murupara.
 Joseph Murray – of Kaitaia.
 Helen Nicoll  – of Auckland.
 Cyril O'Neill – of Christchurch.
 Shanti Thakor Parbhu Patel  – of Auckland.
 Donna Marguerite Philpott – of Wellington.
 Sai Mere Ro Ikadroka Powley – of Auckland.
 The Reverend John Scott – of Wairoa.
 The Reverend Leiite Setefano – of Auckland.
 Ganges Singh  – of Pukekohe.
 Frederick Strachan – of Dunedin.
 Wilfred Allen Subritzky – of Auckland.
 Heni Materoa Sunderland  – of Gisborne.
 Laurie Oliver Wallace Sutton  – of Lower Hutt.
 Thomas Robert Taylor – of Rotorua.
 Daphne Joan Terpstra – of Christchurch.
 Robert Timu  – of Clive.

For public services
 Rey Sevlin Aanensen – of Wanganui; traffic sergeant, Ministry of Transport.
 Michael Gunter Ahrens – of Manukau City.
 Patricia Cameron Allan  – of Cambridge.
 Roy Middlemiss Atkin – of Wellington.
 Francis Edmund Barnard – of Auckland.
 Angus Ross Black – of Dunedin.
 Ngaire Elizabeth Bone  – of Hastings.
 Edward Cranley Britnell  – of Christchurch.
 Joan Catherine Brocklehurst – of Napier.
 Hilary Megan Brown – of Christchurch.
 Peter George Bush – of Wellington.
 Philip Alan Powell Chitty – of Auckland; regional manager (border operations), Customs Department, Auckland.
 MacDonald William Garioch Clunie – of Paraparaumu.
 Graeme Michael Cockroft  – of Invercargill; lately district manager, Traffic Safety Service, Ministry of Transport (Invercargill City).
 Fredrick Charles Domanic Cole  – of Shannon.
 Robert Yeoman Collins – of Rotorua; lately district conservator, Department of Conservation.
 Barry Neville Colman – of Auckland.
 Margaret Walker Cosgrove – of Lower Hutt.
 Jonathan Spencer Dennis – of Wellington.
 Graham David Egarr – of Nelson.
 Bessie Jean Honoré  – of Paraparaumu Beach.
 Ivan Derrick Quentin Hope  – of Gisborne.
 Basil William Leech – of Rangiora.
 Violet Constance McHerron – of Westport.
 Dr Jean Winsome McLean – of Hokitika.
 Richard Halstead Marryatt – of Auckland.
 Michael Mattar – of Taumarunui.
 The Reverend Father Gerard Matthew Mills – of Palmerston North.
 William George Mudgway – of Auckland.
 James Douglas Murray – of Marton.
 Peter Albert Norwood – senior constable, New Zealand Police.
 Charles Pearce  – of Foxton.
 Alan James Ryan – of Auckland.
 Anthony John Srhoy – of Ashburton.
 Roger Bruce Stevenson – of Havelock North.
 Sidney George Tonks – of Auckland.
 Edward Walker  – of Kaitangata.
 Farquhar Davis Wilkinson – of Wellington.
 Arnold Manaaki Wilson – of Auckland.
 Margaret Anne Wilson – of Tauranga.

Queen's Fire Service Medal (QFSM)
 Kevin Harvey Henderson – senior fire commander, New Zealand Fire Service.
 Donald Munro Matheson – senior station officer, Invercargill Volunteer Fire Brigade, New Zealand Fire Service.
 Martin Richard Wynn – fireman, Waipawa Volunteer Fire Brigade, New Zealand Fire Service.

Queen's Police Medal (QPM)
 John Graeme Scott – detective senior sergeant, New Zealand Police.

Air Force Cross (AFC)
 Squadron Leader Andrew John McWilliam – Royal New Zealand Air Force.

Queen's Commendation for Valuable Service in the Air
 Flight Lieutenant Peter Myles Walters – Royal New Zealand Air Force.

References

New Year Honours
1991 awards
1991 in New Zealand
New Zealand awards